is a city located in Saga Prefecture, Japan. As of February 28, 2017, the city has an estimated population of 31,981 and a population density of 260 persons per km2. The total area is 125.01 km2.

The modern city of Kanzaki was established on March 20, 2006, from the merger of the former town of Kanzaki, absorbing the town of Chiyoda, and the village of Sefuri (all from Kanzaki District). As a result of this merger there are no longer any villages in Saga Prefecture.

Geography

The northern part of the city is located in the middle of the Sefuri Mountains. As one goes south the elevation lowers. The southern part consists of the north bank of the Chikugo River and the Saga Plains, and the Jōbaru River runs through the middle portion of the city. The southeast border with Kurume in Fukuoka Prefecture is formed by the Chikugo River.
Mountains: Mount Sefuri (1055 m), Mt. Doki (Mt. Hatten, 430 m)
Rivers: Chikugo River, Jōbaru River, Tade River, Sanbonmatsu River

Adjoining municipalities
Saga Prefecture
Miyaki
Saga
Yoshinogari
Fukuoka Prefecture
Kurume
Ōkawa
Sawara Ward, Fukuoka City

History
April 1, 1889 — The modern municipal system is established. The current city region consists of eight villages (Chitose, Hasuike, Kanzaki, Niiyama, Saigō, Sakaino, Sefuri and Shirota).
1893 — The village of Kanzaki became a town.
November 3, 1935 — The village of Hasuike became a town.
March 31, 1955 — The villages of Saigō and Niiyama were merged into Kanzaki.
April 1, 1955 — The villages of Chitose, Sakaino, Shirota, and parts of the town of Hasuike were merged to create the village of Chiyoda.
April 1, 1965 — Chiyoda became a town.
March 20, 2006 — The former town of Kanzaki absorbed the town of Chiyoda, and the village of Sefuri to create the city of Kanzaki.

Education

Universities
Nishikyushu University (西九州大学)

Prefectural high schools
Kanzaki High School (佐賀県立神埼高等学校)
Kanzaki Seimei High School (佐賀県立神埼清明高等学校)

Municipal junior high schools
Kanzaki Junior High School
Chiyoda Junior High School
Sefuri Junior High School

Municipal elementary schools
Kanzaki Elementary School
Saigō Elementary School
Niiyama Elementary School
Chiyoda Tōbu Elementary School
Chiyoda Chūbu Elementary School
Chiyoda Seibu Elementary School
Sefuri Elementary School

Transportation

Air
The nearest airport is Saga Airport in Kawasoe, followed by Fukuoka Airport.

Rail
JR Kyushu
Nagasaki Main Line
Kanzaki Station

Road
Expressways:
Nagasaki Expressway: The closest interchange is the Higashi-Sefuri Interchange in Yoshinogari, Saga.
National highways:
Route 34
Route 264
Route 385

Notable places and festivals
Kunen Hermitage
Niiyama Shrine
Kushida-gū
Niiyama Park
Hōshu-dera
Yoshinogari Historical Park
Naotori Castle ruins
Home of Kojin Shimomura
Jirōnomori Park
Holiday Chiyoda (堀デーちよだ)

People from Kanzaki
Egashira 2:50

References

External links

 Kanzaki City official website 

Cities in Saga Prefecture